Michael Jurack (born 14 February 1979 in Straubing) is a German judoka.

He won a bronze medal in the half-heavyweight (100 kg) division at the 2004 Summer Olympics.

Achievements

External links
 
 
 Videos of Michael Jurack (judovision.org)

1979 births
Living people
German male judoka
Judoka at the 2004 Summer Olympics
Olympic judoka of Germany
Olympic bronze medalists for Germany
People from Straubing
Sportspeople from Lower Bavaria
Olympic medalists in judo
Medalists at the 2004 Summer Olympics
21st-century German people